Maratua Airport  is an airport located on Maratua Island, East Kalimantan in Indonesia. The airport is built to boost tourism and also to secure defence strategy due to Maratua Island being near the border with Malaysia and the Philippines.

Preparation and budgeting for Maratua Airport began in 2008. However, three years later land clearing began. In September 2015, the first stone laying of the airport was carried out and construction, and on February 13, 2017, an ATR 72 airplane landed successfully at Maratua Airport. Maratua Airport is serving the operations of several airlines since the end of 2017. In addition to serving the transportation of the local community, the airline also transports domestic and foreign tourists to tour the Derawan Islands which have international tourist spots. President of Indonesia Joko Widodo officially inaugurated the airport on 25 October 2018.

Airlines and destinations

References

 

berau Regency
Airports in North Kalimantan